Jones Parry or Jones-Parry may refer to: 

 Emyr Jones Parry (born 1947), British diplomat
Tristram Jones-Parry, British educationalist
Sir Love Jones-Parry, 1st Baronet (1832-1891), Welsh politician and a founder of Patagonia
Love Jones-Parry (soldier) (1781-1853), British army officer and High Sheriff of Anglesey

See also
Parry Jones